Lamar Lavante Lathon (born December 23, 1967) is a former professional American football player. He was drafted by the Houston Oilers in the 1990 NFL Draft and went on to play eight seasons in the NFL. He last played in 1998 with the Carolina Panthers.

See also
1989 Houston Cougars football team

References

1967 births
Living people
Players of American football from Texas
American football linebackers
Houston Cougars football players
Houston Oilers players
Carolina Panthers players
National Conference Pro Bowl players
People from Wharton, Texas
Ed Block Courage Award recipients